Marianne Watz (born 1940) is a Swedish Moderate Party politician. She has been a substitute member of the Riksdag since 2006. From 2006 until 2007, Watz was the substitute for Mikael Odenberg. Currently, she is the substitute for Beatrice Ask.

External links
Marianne Watz at the Riksdag website

Members of the Riksdag from the Moderate Party
Members of the Riksdag 2006–2010
Living people
1940 births
Women members of the Riksdag
21st-century Swedish women politicians